Christoph Hüsser (born 10 February 1954) is a retired Swiss sidecarcross rider and dual Sidecarcross World Champion, having won the competition in 1988 and 1989, together with his passenger Andreas Hüsser, his younger twin brother.

Apart from his two World Championship triumphs he has also won the Swiss national sidecarcross championship on three occasions, in 1988, 1990 and 1991.

Biography
Christoph Hüsser started his motocross career as a solo rider and, unlike his brother Andreas who joint sidecarcross in 1973, he remained in the solo class until 1986, when the two brothers decided to ride together.

He made his debut in the Swiss national championship in 1987, riding with his brother Andreas as his passenger and finishing second, five points behind compatriots Hansi Bächtold and Fritz Fuß, who had won their fourth consecutive World Championship that year. They also took part in the World Championship where they came fifth overall.

The year after Christoph and Andreas Hüsser won the World Championship, 41 points clear of the German team of Walter Netterscheid and Jürgen Hassold, as well as the Swiss championship, making it their most successful season ever.

The Hüsser's were able to defend their World Championship crown in 1989, this time by 26 points but lost the Swiss championship by seven points to Andreas Fuhrer and Hans Ruedi Stettler.

From 1990 onwards Hüsser's World Championship results declined but he remained a force in the Swiss national competition. He only took part in three events in the 1990 World Championship, using a different passenger for each Grand Prix. He rode the first event with Andreas Hüsser but then used Flurin Peer and Sies Hurkmans for the next two, finishing 19th overall in the competition. Hüsser however did take out his second Swiss title that season, once more with Andreas Hüsser as his passenger.

In 1991 and 1992 he rode the World Championship with Adrian Käser, who would later, as passenger of Andreas Fuhrer, win four World titles himself. The new combination finished eighth in the World Championship in 1991 and sixth in 1992. On Swiss level the two won the title in 1991 and finished third in 1992.

The 1993 World Championship season saw the Hüsser's, Christoph and Andreas, reunited except in two events, where Fritz Witschi served as his passenger. The Hüsser's achieved their last-ever race win in a Grand Prix together that season, in Switzerland, but only came 17th overall. In the Swiss championship the two came third that season.

In the 1994 season Hüsser raced the full World Championship program for a last time, coming 11th overall, now with Hans-Rudi Stettler as his passenger. In Switzerland the duo achieved another third place that year.

His last two seasons in the World Championship, 1995 and 1996, saw Hüsser only race three events each year. In both seasons he finished 24th overall, in 1995 with Roger Maurer as his passenger, in 1996 with Conny Johannson. In the Swiss championship he finished third again in 1995 and fifth in 1996.

After the 1996 season Christoph Hüsser retired from both the Swiss and the World Championship, the same year Andreas Fuhrer and Adrian Käser did, the World Champions from 1993 to 1996, bringing to an end the Swiss-dominated era of the Sidecarcross World Championship, which had yielded 12 World Championship for the country in 15 years from 1982 to 1996.

Personal
Christoph Hüsser, together with his twin brother, grew up on his grandparents farm at Stetten, Aargau. After his active career he started a mobile toilet hire service in 2001.

Racing record

Sidecarcross World Championship
Christoph Hüsser 's results in the Sidecarcross World Championship were:.

Honours

World Championship
 Champions: (2) 1988, 1989

National Championships
 Swiss national championship: 
 Champions: (3) 1988, 1990, 1991
 Runners-up: (2) 1987, 1989

References

External links
 The World Championship on Sidecarcross.com

1954 births
Living people
People from Baden District, Aargau
Swiss sidecarcross riders
Sportspeople from Aargau